Arnold Walker (23 December 1932 – 25 December 2017) was an English professional footballer who played as a wing half.

References

1932 births
People from Haltwhistle
Footballers from Northumberland
English footballers
Association football wing halves
Appleby Frodingham F.C. players
Grimsby Town F.C. players
Walsall F.C. players
English Football League players
2017 deaths